The Cathedral of Saint Patrick is the seat of the Roman Catholic Church in Charlotte, North Carolina, United States of America. It is the mother church of the Diocese of Charlotte and is the seat of its bishop. In 1987 it was included as a contributing property in the Dilworth Historic District, listed on the National Register of Historic Places.

History
In 1843, St. Joseph Church in Mt. Holly was built. It was to be the first Catholic church in Western North Carolina.  On St. Patrick's Day 1852, the cornerstone was laid for the city of Charlotte's first Catholic church, St. Peter Church. Work was completed in 1893.

St. Peter Church was under the care of the Benedictine monks from Belmont Abbey. A neighboring convent of the Sisters of Mercy, also in Belmont had operated a school in Charlotte known originally as St. Mary's Seminary.  The name was later changed to the O'Donoghue School, and in September 1930 it was moved to the Dilworth neighborhood.  It was not until the 1930s that an additional church was needed to accommodate the growing Catholic population of the region.

Construction
St. Patrick Church was built adjacent to the O'Donoghue School, in the Dilworth neighborhood.  John Henry Phelan of Beaumont, Texas donated the funds to build St. Patrick Church, in loving memory of his parents, Patrick and Margaret Adele Phelan. Construction of the church began on St. Patrick's Day, 1938.

A Catholic grade school was built on the property in 1930. A rectory and convent were completed in 1941, and in 1943, the school was expanded to include high school grades.

What was once the O'Donoghue School in Charlotte, NC is the oldest privately conducted school in Charlotte. O'Donoghue School was established on August 27, 1887, by the Sisters of Mercy, a Roman Catholic religious order, as St. Mary's Seminary. The name was changed in 1905 to honor Dr. Dennis O'Donoghue, whose bequest made possible the large building at 531 South Tryon Street, home of the school for many years. in 1930, Father Michael McInerney designed a parochial school to be built of granite and cost $90,000. The O'Donoghue School was moved to 1125 Buchanan Street in Dilworth neighborhood in 1930. Its imposing stone building is now St. Patrick Catholic School, the oldest Catholic school operating in the Charlotte area.

In 1955 Charlotte Catholic High School was established, and in 1968 the all-girl Our Lady of Mercy High School was closed and combined with the formerly all-boy Charlotte Catholic High School, thereby reducing the grade level to K-8.

In 1995, CCHS was moved to a new campus and Holy Trinity Middle School was established on the old CCHS campus. This resulted in a further reduction of grade levels to K-5 at St Pats.

Architectural features

Frank Frimmer, architect and native of Austria, known for remodeling Old World churches, designed and supervised construction of the church, with its gray stucco face, 400-seat nave, balcony and 77-foot (23.7m) tall tower. 
 Picture of Cathedral Facade

The altar contains relics of St. Jucundius and St. Justina, and two side chapels were crafted as shrines honoring the Blessed Virgin Mary and Saint Joseph. Stained glass windows, designed in Syracuse, New York, depicted the Annunciation, St. Patrick, St. Joseph's deathbed scene, King David with his lyre, St. Cecilia, and some events in the life of Jesus.

The church proper has 300 ceiling tiles.

During the 1990s, the church underwent some construction updates and modernizing.

The balcony contains a large pipe organ.

At some point, the name of the school was renamed O'Donoghue school. Several decades later the school was renamed St Patrick's. However, at the parking lot entrance near the road, the is a ramp with stairs leading to the gymnasium. Underneath this ramp, on the wall, the stylized brick display showing the mame of the school as "O'Donoghue" is still clearly visible and displayed.

Consecration
On September 4, 1939, Bishop Eugene J. McGuinness of Raleigh consecrated the church under the patronage of St. Patrick. It became the first church in North Carolina to be consecrated immediately upon completion and in 1942 became a parish, with Goldsboro-native Monsignor Arthur R. Freeman as pastor.

Establishment of new diocese
During the next few decades, the influx of Catholics added to the need for ministerial presence in Charlotte, and three parishes grew from St. Patrick: St. Ann, St. Gabriel and St. Vincent de Paul.

On January 12, 1972, Pope Paul VI established the Diocese of Charlotte, and St. Patrick Church was designated the cathedral church. Msgr. Richard Allen, pastor at the time, was appointed the first rector.

Renovation
The cathedral experienced a period of major renovation beginning in 1979. The original exterior of the building, including memorials and windows, was preserved while the interior was radically altered. The original high altar, installed by the Benedictines, was destroyed. A new freestanding altar was installed.  Artwork of local and religious significance were added during this period, as well. Additionally, the original Moller pipe organ was replaced with a new one, designed and manufactured by W. Zimmer and Sons of Fort Mill, and installed in the balcony.

The cathedral remained closed for six months. On June 10, 1979, Bishop Michael J. Begley of Charlotte presided over the celebration of the church's reopening.

The majority of renovative efforts to restore St. Patrick Cathedral to its original condition was completed by Easter of 1996, yet periodic work has continued. The altar, baptismal font, statues and ambo were given new prominence, and a hardwood floor was installed. The dark oak wainscoting from the 1979 renovation was removed to brighten up the cathedral and make it appear as it did in 1939.

Most recently, Stations of the Cross brought in from Maggie Valley, NC and a Celtic cross were added outside. A permanent copper roof was installed and completed on December 7, 2000.

On March 28, 2007, a 700 pound bell was raised in the bell tower.  The bell was a gift from Herb and Louise Bowers and family.  It was originally cast in 1875 in St. Louis, MO.  The bell was blessed after the 5:30 PM Mass on Saturday, March 31, 2007.

Father Paul Q. Gary served as rector of St. Patrick Cathedral from July 1996 until July 2008.

Very Reverend Christopher A. Roux is currently the Rector of St. Patrick Cathedral.

See also

List of Catholic cathedrals in the United States
List of cathedrals in the United States

References

External links

 Official Cathedral Site
 Diocese of Charlotte Official Site

Christian organizations established in 1938
Roman Catholic churches completed in 1939
Patrick Charlotte
Churches in Charlotte, North Carolina
Gothic Revival church buildings in North Carolina
Roman Catholic Diocese of Charlotte
20th-century Roman Catholic church buildings in the United States
Churches on the National Register of Historic Places in North Carolina
Historic district contributing properties in North Carolina